WVLN (740 AM) is a radio station broadcasting a sports talk format.  Licensed to Olney, Illinois, United States, the station is owned by Forcht Broadcasting and features programming from CBS Sports Radio. 740 AM is a Canadian clear-channel frequency, on which CFZM in Toronto, Ontario is the dominant Class A station; WVLN must reduce nighttime power to protect the skywave signal of CFZM.

History
WVLN began broadcasting on November 11, 1947, and ran 250 watts during daytime hours only. The station was owned by Olney Broadcasting Company. In January 1958, the station was sold to Illinois Broadcasting Company for $95,000. In 1972, WVLN was sold to Public Service Broadcasters, Inc., along with 92.9 WSEI, for $265,488. In 1976, it was sold to Eugene McPherson, along with WSEI, for $352,000. In 1976, it was sold to Terry Forcht's V.L.N. Broadcasting, along with WSEI, for $1,120,000.

FM translator
In addition to the main station at 740 kHz, WVLN is relayed to an FM translator broadcasting on 107.1 MHz.  The FM signal helps make up for some of the loss in coverage to the north of Olney during nighttime hours when the AM station broadcasts with only 7 watts.

References

External links
WVLN's website

VLN
Sports radio stations in the United States
CBS Sports Radio stations
Radio stations established in 1947
1947 establishments in Illinois